The 1969–70 Allsvenskan was the 36th season of the top division of Swedish handball. 10 teams competed in the league. HK Drott won the regular season, but SoIK Hellas won the playoffs and claimed their fourth Swedish title. UoIF Matteuspojkarna and Vikingarnas IF were relegated.

League table

Playoffs

Semifinals
 SoIK Hellas–Redbergslids IK 12–10, 12–12 (SoIK Hellas advance to the finals)
 HK Drott–IF Saab 18–14, 15–18 (HK Drott advance to the finals)

Finals
 SoIK Hellas–HK Drott 20–17, 11–11 (SoIK Hellas champions)

References 

Swedish handball competitions